Lechería (Spanish for "dairy") may refer to:

Mexico
 Autopista Chamapa-Lechería, a toll road in Greater Mexico City
 Lechería railway station of the Mexico City suburban train system Ferrocarril Suburbano
 Lechería (Mexibús), a BRT station in Tultitlán, Mexico

Venezuela
, Diego Bautista Urbaneja Municipality, Venezuela